Fissurellidae, common name the keyhole limpets and slit limpets, is a taxonomic family of limpet-like sea snails, marine gastropod molluscs in the clade Vetigastropoda.
Their common name derives from the small hole in the apex of their cone-like shells.  Although superficially resembling "true" limpets, they are in fact not closely related to them.

Distribution
The distribution of fissurellids is worldwide, from cold waters to tropical waters.

Habitat
Fissurellids live in habitats on and under rocks in the lower intertidal zones to deeper waters.

Shell description

Keyhole limpets somewhat resemble true limpets because of the simple conical shape of their shells, but in reality they are not closely related to true limpets, which are in the clade Patellogastropoda. This conical shape of the shell allows keyhole limpets to withstand wave attack on exposed rocks. The shell has a reticulate (= net-like) structure with strong radial ribs and lacks an operculum. The shell ranges from 3 mm to 13.2 cm. The great keyhole limpet (Megathura crenulata) measures up to 13.2 cm.

For respiration, the shells of fissurellids have a single apical or subapical perforation ("keyhole"). This opening at the top allows a direct exit of exhalant water currents together with waste products from the mantle cavity. The water enters under the edge of the shell near the head and passes over  large paired gills. Most young species in this family have a marginal slit in the middle of the anterior end of the spiral shell. Some species possess just a short internal groove at the anterior end. The paired organs in the mantle cavity represent a primitive condition in gastropods.

The soft body consists of a well-developed head, a short muzzle. It has a broad and flat foot and a well-developed mantle. This foot exerts a strong suction, adhering the keyhole limpet to its hard substratum.  The mantle extends in some species partly or completely (as in Megathura crenulata) over the shell. The tentacles at the epipodium (the lateral grooves between foot and mantle) are well developed. The species in Medusafissurella have numerous subequal tentacles at the propodium, while the species in Dendrofissurella have an outgrowth with main trunk and side branches at the propodium. The eyes are situated on rudimentary pedicels at their outer bases. The sides are ornamented with short cirri. There are two, symmetrical branchial plumes . The anal siphon occupies the anterior notch or perforated summit of the shell.

In addition to the possession of this hole, slit or groove, keyhole limpets differ in several other ways both internally and externally from true limpets.

Feeding habits
Keyhole limpets are in essence herbivorous, feeding primarily on algae, but are also detritus feeders. A few species in the genera Diodora and Emarginella are carnivorous, feeding on sponges. Puncturella has been reported to digest diatoms and detritus. Puncturella aethiopica feeds mainly on Foraminifera.

Taxonomy
Family Fissurellidae Fleming, 1822  
Subfamily Diodorinae Odhner, 1932
Subfamily Emarginulinae Children, 1834  
Subfamily Fissurellinae Fleming, 1822  
Subfamily Hemitominae Kuroda, Habe & Oyama, 1971: synonym of Zeidorinae Naef, 1913
Subfamily Zeidorinae Naef, 1913

This classification was based by Bouchet & Rocroi on the studies by Keen (in Moore) (1960), Christiaens (1973)  and McMean (1984).

Aktipis S.W., Boehm E. & Giribet G. (2011) then raised the tribe Diodorini to the status of subfamily Diodorinae.

Genera 
Genera within the family Fissurellidae include:

 Agariste Monterosato, 1892
 Altrix Palmer, 1942
 Amblychilepas Pilsbry, 1890
 Buchanania Lesson, 1830
 Clathrosepta McLean & Geiger, 1998
 Clypidina Gray, 1847
 Cornisepta McLean & Geiger, 1998
 Cosmetalepas Iredale, 1924
  Cranopsis Adams, 1860
 Dendrofissurella Mclean and Kilburn, 1986
 Diodora Gray, 1821
 Emarginula Lamarck, 1801
 Fissurella Bruguière, 1789
 Fissurellidea d'Orbigny, 1841
 Fissurisepta Seguenza, 1863
 Hemimarginula McLean, 2011
 Hemitoma Swainson, 1840
 Laeviemarginula Habe In Kuroda, 1953
 Laevinesta Pilsbry and McGinty, 1952
 Leurolepas J. H. McLean, 1970
 Lucapina Sowerby, 1835
 Lucapinella Pilsbry, 1890
 Macroschisma Sowerby, 1839
 Manganesepta McLean & Geiger, 1998
 Medusafissurella Mclean and Kilburn, 1986
 Megathura Pilsbry, 1890
 Monodilepas Finlay, 1927
 Montfortia Récluz, 1843
 Montfortista Iredale, 1929
 Montfortula Iredale, 1915
 Montfortulana Habe, 1961
 Nesta Adams, 1870
 Octomarginula McLean, 2011
 Parmaphorella Strebel, 1907
 Profundisepta McLean & Geiger, 1998
 Puncturella R. T. Lowe, 1827
 Pupillaea Gray In Sowerby, 1835
 Rimula DeFrance, 1827
 Rimulanax Iredale, 1924 (taxon inquerendum)
 Scelidotoma Choe, Yoon and Habe, 1992
 Scutus Montfort, 1810
 Stromboli Berry, 1954
 Tugali Gray in Dieffenbach, 1843
 Tugalina Habe, 1953
 Vacerrena Iredale, 1958
 Variemarginula McLean, 2011
 Zeidora A. Adams, 1860

 Genera brought into synonymy
 Austroglyphis Cotton & Godfrey, 1934: synonym of Diodora Gray, 1821
 Aviscutum Iredale, 1940: synonym of Scutus Montfort, 1810
 Capiluna Gray, 1857: synonym of Diodora Gray, 1821
 Cemoria Risso, 1826 [ex Leach MS]: synonym of Puncturella Lowe, 1827
  Cremoria [Gray, 1842]: synonym of Puncturella Lowe, 1827
 Elegidion Iredale, 1924: synonym of Diodora J. E. Gray, 1821
 Emarginella Pilsbry, 1890: synonym of Emarginula Lamarck, 1801
 Entomella Cotton, 1945: synonym of Emarginula Lamarck, 1801
 Fissuridea Swainson, 1840: synonym of Diodora J. E. Gray, 1821
 Glyphis Carpenter, 1857: synonym of Diodora J. E. Gray, 1821
 Legrandia Beddome, 1883: synonym of Zeidora A. Adams, 1860
 Megatebennus Pilsbry, 1890: synonym of Fissurellidea d'Orbigny, 1839
 Nannoscutum Iredale, 1937: synonym of Scutus Montfort, 1810
 Nesta H. Adams, 1870: synonym of Zeidora A. Adams, 1860
 Notomella Cotton, 1957: synonym of Emarginula Lamarck, 1801
 Parmophoridea Wenz, 1938: synonym of Parmaphorella Strebel, 1907
 Parmophorus Blainville, 1817: synonym of Scutus Montfort, 1810
 Plagiorhytis P. Fischer, 1885: synonym of Montfortula Iredale, 1915
 Scutum P. Fischer, 1885: synonym of Scutus Montfort, 1810
 Semperia Crosse, 1867: synonym of Emarginula Lamarck, 1801
  Sipho T. Brown, 1827: synonym of Puncturella Lowe, 1827
 Siphonella Issel, 1869: synonym of Montfortista Iredale, 1929
 Subemarginula Gray, 1847: synonym of Hemitoma Swainson, 1840
  Subzeidora Iredale, 1924: synonym of Emarginula (Subzeidora) Iredale, 1924
 Tugalia Gray, 1857: synonym of Tugali Gray, 1843
 Vacerra Iredale, 1924: synonym of Puncturella Lowe, 1827
 Zidora P. Fischer, 1885: synonym of Zeidora A. Adams, 1860

See also
Keyhole limpet hemocyanin

References

General references

Inline citations

Further reading
 Sowerby, G.B. Jr. (1862). Monograph of the family Fissurellidae. Reprinted edition (1982). Thesaurus conchyliorum, or monographs of genera of shells. Luis Pisani Burnay: Lisboa, Portugal. 183-206, 9 col. Plates pp.

External links 
 Archerd Shell Collection : Fissurellidae 
 
 
 Aktipis S.W., Boehm E. & Giribet G. (2011) Another step towards understanding the slit-limpets (Fissurellidae, Fissurelloidea, Vetigastropoda, Gastropoda): a combined five-gene molecular phylogeny. Zoologica Scripta 40: 238-259.
 Miocene Gastropods and Biostratigraphy of the Kern River Area, California; United States Geological Survey Professional Paper 642 

 
Taxa named by John Fleming (naturalist)
Gastropod families